Le vieux fusil (English title: The Old Gun or Vengeance One by One) is a 1975 French-West German war drama film directed by Robert Enrico, and starring Philippe Noiret, Romy Schneider and Jean Bouise. It won the 1976 César Award for Best Film, Best Actor and Best Music, and was nominated for best director, supporting actor, writing, cinematography, editing and sound. The film is based on the Massacre of Oradour-sur-Glane in 1944.

Plot
In Montauban in 1944, during the Invasion of Normandy, Julien Dandieu is an aging, embittered surgeon in the local hospital. Frightened by German troops entering Montauban, Dandieu asks his friend Francois to drive his wife and his daughter to the remote village where he owns a château. One week later, Dandieu sets off to meet them for the weekend, but the Germans have now occupied the village. He finds that all the villagers have been herded into the church and shot. In the château, now occupied by the Germans, he finds his daughter shot and his wife immolated by a flame-thrower.

Dandieu decides to kill as many Germans as possible to avenge his family. He takes an old shotgun he used as a child while hunting with his father and sabotages the château's bridge before he starts to kill them one by one, taking advantage of his knowledge of the secret passages within the château. Trapped inside the castle, the Germans begin to think their attackers are French partisans and do not realise that he is, in fact, the only one. When a Resistance detachment drops by, Dandieu refuses their offer to help him and continues his vendetta on his own. Eventually, with no more cartridges for the shotgun, he collects the flame-thrower which killed his beloved wife and uses it to kill the leading SS officer as he, the last survivor, is about to commit suicide.

Alerted by the Resistance, the inhabitants of a nearby village and a company of American soldiers arrive to collect the dead. Dandieu is picked up by Francois, but has suffered a nervous breakdown following the aftermath of the slaughter, behaving as if his family was still alive. The film ends with a flashback to one of his happier days now gone, where he and his family had undertaken a bike tour.

Cast
 Philippe Noiret as Julien Dandieu
 Romy Schneider as Clara Dandieu
 Jean Bouise as François
 Joachim Hansen as SS Officer
 Robert Hoffmann as SS Lieutenant
 Karl Michael Vogler as Dr. Müller
 Madeleine Ozeray as Julien's Mother

See also
 Bruniquel, in the Tarn-et-Garonne department, the village where the film was shot.
 Château de Bruniquel, the landmark of the village, where most of the film was shot.

References

External links
 
 
 

1975 films
1970s war drama films
1970s French-language films
French war drama films
German war drama films
Films about the French Resistance
Films set in 1944
Films directed by Robert Enrico
Best Film César Award winners
Films featuring a Best Actor César Award-winning performance
French films about revenge
Western Front of World War II films
Films scored by François de Roubaix
Films set in castles
Oradour-sur-Glane massacre
1975 drama films
1975 war films
1970s French films
1970s German films